The Mud Caves are a popular feature in Anza Borrego Desert State Park in San Diego County, California. The caves, located in the Carrizo Badlands, along the Arroyo Tapiado, were created by water flowing through a thick deposit of silt and are an example of pseudokarst topography. Many of the caves are easily accessed.

Some of the caves found here include:
Big Mud Cave - The only cave marked on most maps.
Hidden Cave - Impossible to find without precise directions.
Chasm Cave - A popular cave with a beautiful skylight.
Carey's Big Mud Cave - The largest cave in the arroyo.
Plunge Pool Cave - A short cave that ends in a spectacular round room that towers above you.
Dip Slope Cave - The small entrance is easy to miss.

References

External links
 
 
 
 

Caves of California
Anza-Borrego Desert State Park
Landforms of San Diego County, California
Show caves in the United States
Tourist attractions in San Diego County, California